Aoi Enomoto (榎本 葵, born July 24, 1992) is a Japanese professional baseball outfielder. He played in Japan's Nippon Professional Baseball for the Tohoku Rakuten Golden Eagles from 2012 to 2015 and the Tokyo Yakult Swallows in 2017. Enomoto then played for the Toyama GRN Thunderbirds in the BC League in 2018 and 2019.

References

External links

NPB stats

1992 births
Japanese baseball players
Living people
Nippon Professional Baseball outfielders
Baseball people from Kanagawa Prefecture
Tohoku Rakuten Golden Eagles players
Tokyo Yakult Swallows players